Woodside Square is a shopping mall in Toronto, Ontario, Canada. It is located at the northwest corner of Finch Avenue East and McCowan Road at Sandhurst Circle. The mall is located in the heart of Agincourt in the Scarborough district.

History
The mall opened in 1977. Notable anchors at one time included Dominion, J. Pascal's Hardware and Furniture  (later as Zellers), and a Chinese cuisine named "Ruby Chinese Restaurant." The Scarborough Public Library Board also opened the Woodside Square branch in the mall during the mall's early years of operation.

The Zellers was closed down and the space divided into multiple retailers and includes a Food Basics.

Near the mid-2000s, the McDonald's which had been located inside the mall was rebuilt as a freestanding tenant outside the mall to accommodate with the number of customers.

In 2007, the library began to run out of room for its collection, while coincidentally, the Dominion supermarket was closing down at the mall, as it was being acquired by Metro Inc. This supermarket location ended up not being converted into a Metro, and was renovated to include more retail space. The library was moved here, and a Shopper's Drug Mart was opened in the remaining space.

On 7 October 2009, Toronto Public Health closed the Ruby Chinese Cuisine after a man supposedly died after eating food from the cuisine. After investigations, an outbreak of salmonella was found in the restaurant.

They include many fast food restaurants, a Le Château Outlet, and another Chinese restaurant, named Congee Town.

In 2019, the mall underwent interior renovations to modernize the mall. New ceramic flooring, smooth ceiling, LED lighting, restaurants, and an upgraded food court and washroom were part of the renovations.

See also
 List of shopping malls in Toronto

References

Buildings and structures in Scarborough, Toronto
Shopping malls in Toronto